Dersu is a small village located in the Primorsky Krai, in the Far Eastern Federal District of Russia. It is populated primarily by Old Believers.

References

Rural localities in Primorsky Krai
Old Believer communities in Russia